Lincoln Parish may refer to:
 Lincoln Parish, New Brunswick, Canada
 Lincoln Parish, Louisiana, United States
 Lincoln Parish (musician), former member of the band Cage the Elephant

Parish name disambiguation pages